Charlie McCarthy, Detective is a 1939 American comedy film starring Edgar Bergen,  Charlie McCarthy and Robert Cummings.

Plot
Scotty Hamilton is a reporter who works for a crooked editor. Bill Banning is another reporter who is about to expose the editor's ties to the mob. When the editor is killed, both reporter Banning and mobster Tony Garcia are suspected. However, Hamilton's friend Edgar Bergen solves the case (without much help from Charlie McCarthy).

Cast

Uncredited

Production
The film was announced in June 1938. It was the second movie Bergen made for Universal following Letter of Introduction. Bob Cummings was assigned in October 1939.

Filming took place from November to December 1939.

Reception
The New York Times called it "a nondescript omlette".

References

External links

1939 films
American comedy films
Films directed by Frank Tuttle
1939 comedy films
1930s English-language films
1930s American films